Originally produced by Minolta, then by Sony, the AF Reflex 500mm f/8 was a catadioptric photographic lens compatible with cameras using the Minolta A-mount and Sony A-mount lens mounts.

The Minolta/Sony Reflex 500mm lens was the only production mirror lens designed to auto focus with an SLR camera.  There are other mirror lenses that can mount onto current mounts such as Canon EF-mount and Nikon F-mount, but all of these mirror lenses are manual focus only.  Only this lens can have its focus controlled by the camera's autofocus motor in conjunction with TTL autofocus sensing.  In terms of the Minolta AF and subsequent Sony α SLR systems, this lens is an anomaly, being the only lens guaranteed to auto focus at 8. Minolta also produced a V-mount 400 mm f/8 Reflex lens that can autofocus at 8, but only the Minolta Vectis S-1, Minolta Vectis S-100 and Minolta Dimâge RD 3000 can use it.

The mirror design does not utilize aperture blades, and thus the aperture of the lens is fixed at 8.  Exposure may only be controlled by shutter speed, film or sensor sensitivity, or a rear-mounted neutral density filter.

By using a mirror design similar to that of a telescope, this lens uses very little glass compared to traditional telephoto lenses and is thus much smaller, lighter, and far less expensive than traditional lenses in the same focal length.  However,  this and all other mirror lenses, can produce a donut-shaped bokeh in the image it produces, which is usually undesirable.

Adapters for Sony E-Mount
Using this lens on a Sony E-mount camera requires the Sony LA-EA2 or LA-EA4 adapter. Autofocus is disabled with the LA-EA1, LA-EA3 and LA-EA5 adapters, i.e., the lens will be manual focus only.

RF ROKKOR-X manual focus version
Minolta also made a manual focus, SR-mount version of this lens. That version was designated RF ROKKOR-X. Adapters are available for Sony E-mount cameras.

See also
List of Minolta A-mount lenses

References
 Technical data and user reviews (Minolta Version) on dyxum.com
 Technical data and user reviews (Sony Version) on dyxum.com

Sources
Dyxum lens data

500
Mirror lenses
Camera lenses introduced in 1989